Meshal Aljaser is a Saudi Arabian filmmaker, most notable for fast cutting, and topics that address the clash of Saudi culture, and musings at religious belief and the afterlife. His made a mini-series Folaim Ya Gholaim, and a short film Arabian Alien which premiered in the Sundance Film Festival in 2019. His short film Is Sumyati Going to Hell? tackles issues of religion, culture, and injustice towards maids in Saudi Arabia. It is told from the eyes of a young protagonist who questions her family's beliefs. It is featured as part of Netflix's six windows in the desert. He has often tried to push the cultural boundaries through provocative videos, such as when he features a Saudi man licking an American woman's face on his music video "Fadayeh" [scandals].

Aljaser's style is often satirical, experimental and fast-paced. He has won numerous awards such as Ahmad Al Shugairi's program Qomrah 2, for creating the film "Under Concrete" addressing the issues of Refugees of the Syrian civil war and homelessness.

His film Arabian Alien is considered a genre of science fiction, and addresses the marriage between a couple who finds himself an alien. It features Saudi comedian Abu Hamdan, and the music of Saudi-American R&B musician Tamtam. It premiered at Sundance Film Festival, won best short film at Atlanta Film Festival, nominating it for best short film at the Oscars.

Early life and education 

He is a New York Film Academy Screenplay graduate.

References 

Saudi Arabian film people
Year of birth missing (living people)
Living people
New York Film Academy alumni
Filmmakers